The Rameswaram TV Tower is a free-standing tower that was built in 1995. The tower is used by Doordarshan for television broadcasting. The main structure is made of reinforced cement concrete and the mast is made of lattice steel.

Geography
The Rameswaram TV Tower is situated in the town of Rameswaram, which is a small municipality in the Ramanathapuram district, an administrative district in the South Indian state of Tamil Nadu.

References

External links

Location in Wikimapia
Structurae

Towers completed in 1995
Buildings and structures in Tamil Nadu
Communication towers in India
Rameswaram
1995 establishments in Tamil Nadu
20th-century architecture in India